The 1932 United States presidential election in Virginia took place on November 8, 1932. Voters chose 11 representatives, or electors to the Electoral College, who voted for president and vice president.

Virginia voted for the Democratic nominee, New York Governor Franklin D. Roosevelt, over the Republican nominee, incumbent President Herbert Hoover. Roosevelt ultimately won the national election with 57.41% of the vote. , this is the last election in which Carroll County, Highland County, and Shenandoah County voted for a Democratic presidential candidate.

Results

Results by county or independent city

References

Virginia
1932
1932 Virginia elections